After Hegemony (full title: After Hegemony: Cooperation and Discord in the World Political Economy) is a book by Robert Keohane first published in 1984. It is a leading text in the liberal institutionalist international relations scholarship. The book challenges neorealist claims that meaningful international cooperation is not possible, as well as hegemonic stability theory claims that international cooperation is only possible under hegemony. The book applies insights from new institutional economics to international relations. The book shows how realist assumptions about actors and the international system can logically lead to the conclusion that meaningful cooperation is possible.

Content

The author shows that multilateral cooperation is possible in the absence of a hegemonic power. The crisis of multilateralism brought on by the United States at the end of World War II does not necessarily mean the end of multilateralism. Keohane thus fights against the idea that the decline of American power necessarily leads to the disappearance of international regimes.

The central thesis of Keohane, resolutely neo-institutionalist, is that multilateral institutions are useful to states. A greater institutionalization of international life, namely the development of international agreements, international regimes or international organizations, would make it possible to manage or even control global conflicts.

Keohane describes the process of forming the theoretical insights of After Hegemony as follows during the late 1970s,

References

International relations theory
1984 non-fiction books
American political books
Books about liberalism
Books about international relations
Princeton University Press books